Lonicera tragophylla, the Chinese honeysuckle, is a species of flowering plant in the family Caprifoliaceae, native to Central China, where it inhabits forest, scrub and rocky crevices. Unlike many of its relatives in the honeysuckle genus Lonicera, it is unscented.

The Latin specific epithet tragophylla means literally “goat leaf”.

This plant has gained the Royal Horticultural Society’s Award of Garden Merit.

References

Flora of China
tragophylla